The Maritimes Basin is a Mid-Devonian to Early Permian sedimentary basin that underlies parts of the northeastern United States and Atlantic Canada. It is a composite basin, meaning that it consists of many sub-basins, such as the Windsor-Kennetcook Basin of Nova Scotia. Some of these basins host important natural resources, including coal, petroleum, and minerals such as sylvite, halite, and barite. The Maritimes Basin was deposited and tectonically-modified during the final assembly of Pangea.

List of sub-basins in Nova Scotia
The Maritimes Basin consists of eleven sub-basins in Nova Scotia:
Windsor-Kennetcook Basin
Debert-Kemptown Basin
Shubenacadie Basin
Musquodoboit Basin
Cumberland Basin
Stellarton Basin
St. Mary's Basin
Antigonish Basin
Western Cape Breton Basin
Central Cape Breton Basin
Sydney Basin

The region has a complex basin history in terms of syndepositional deformation and superimposition of numerous episodes of fault reactivation in the basin. As such, each basin has distinctive stratigraphy, especially within the lowermost Carboniferous section.

The eleven sub-basins are located in this clickable map:

References

Geology of Nova Scotia
Sedimentary basins of North America